Lūau, known alternatively as Poulet fafa in French Polynesia, Rourou in Fiji and Rukau in the Cook Islands is a traditional Polynesian stew. The name of this dish in Hawaii and other parts of the pacific is derived from its main ingredient, Taro leaves, which are cooked down and coconut milk added. Variations of this dish differ between islands. In Hawaii, octopus is added to this dish alongside onion and garlic, the dish being referred to as Squid Lū'au.

See also
List of stews
Laing (food), a similar native dish from the Philippines
Callaloo, a similar native dish from the Caribbean 
Lili'uokalani Protestant Church, which is known for its version of the dish

References

Hawaiian cuisine
French Polynesian cuisine
Fijian cuisine
Cook Islands cuisine
Polynesian cuisine
Oceanian cuisine
Octopus dishes
Chicken dishes
Squid dishes
Foods containing coconut